Return to the Valley of The Go-Go's is the Go-Go's second compilation album, released in 1994. There were two versions of this compilation released: a single disc, and a double disc version. All recordings found on the single disc are identical to those on the double.

Background

After disbanding in 1985 members of the Go-Go's gradually began to reassemble, with Go-Go's songwriter Charlotte Caffey contributing to the material on most of singer Belinda Carlisle's solo albums. The group's members eventually resolved legal and creative differences and began to collaborate as a band again, beginning with a compilation album that would be a more comprehensive representation of the band than their 1990 greatest hits album.

Return to the Valley of The Go-Go's documents the Go-Go's history from their genesis in the Los Angeles punk rock scene through their success as a mainstream new wave band. The compilation included rehearsal, demo, and live recordings that had never been previously released, the original Stiff Records version of the band's first single, "We Got the Beat," as well as the group's major hits, B-sides, and deeper tracks culled from the studio sessions that generated the Go-Go's' first three LPs. The collection also featured new live material and three new "reunion tracks" written and studio-recorded by the band in 1994 for the collection. One of these new songs, "The Whole World Lost Its Head," gave the band its first top 40 hit in the Britain.

The CD release included a booklet that featured photos and liner notes from the members of the band, including a group history, reflections, and anecdotes about each member's favorite songs.

Critical reception

Writing for Rolling Stone, critic Paul Corio wrote that the compilation "offers trippy joy in abundance." In a retrospective review, AllMusic's Ned Raggett ranked Return To The Valley Of The Go-Go's, compared to other best-of compilations of the band, as "the clearest winner, by a long shot."

Track listing

Single disc version

Two-disc version

Chart positions

Album

Singles

References

1994 compilation albums
The Go-Go's albums
I.R.S. Records compilation albums